The 1967 National 500 was a NASCAR Grand National Series stock car race that was held on October 15, 1967, at Charlotte Motor Speedway in Concord, North Carolina.

The transition to purpose-built racecars began in the early 1960s and occurred gradually over that decade.  Changes made to the sport by the late 1960s brought an end to the "strictly stock" vehicles of the 1950s.

Race report
The race was held on a dry circuit; with no precipitation recorded around the speedway.

Sixty thousand live spectators attended the event where Buddy Baker managed to defeat Bobby Isaac by more than one lap; becoming the 100th different driver to win what is now known as a NASCAR Cup Series race. Nine cautions were handed out by NASCAR officials for 64 laps. The race took three hours and fifty minutes to fully complete. In reality, the speeds in the race actually approached . Whitey Gerken finished in last place due to a crash on lap 2 out of the 334 laps raced on a paved track spanning . All 44 of the drivers on the racing grid were American-born males. Future three time Formula One Champion Jackie Stewart entered but he failed to qualify.

Richard Petty 10-race winning streak ended at this race. Bobby Wawak made his best career finish as an owner with one of his vehicles finishing in seventh place. The qualifying speeds recorded for the race were an average for a 4-lap qualifying run. J.T. Putney raced his way into this one by winning the last chance qualifying race. He then finished 11th in the main event with Henley Gray, another driver who raced in, taking 12th.

LeeRoy Yarbrough was scheduled to drive in Junior Johnson's No. 26 vehicle but the car was wrecked in practice due to a fire extinguisher going off automatically. 22 lead changes were made amongst seven different leaders.

Notable crew chiefs on attendance for the race were Harry Hyde, Dale Inman, Jake Elder among others.

Don Schissler and Dub Simpson made their NASCAR debuts here. The total prize purse for this race was $87,005 ($ when adjusted for inflation). Buddy Baker received $18,950 in winnings ($ when adjusted for inflation) while last-place finisher Whitey Gerken walked away with only $625 ($ when adjusted for inflation).

Qualifying
Note: The speeds shown are an average for a 4-lap qualifying run.

The first 37 spots in the field were set via qualifying. The final 7 spots were filled by the top 7 finishers in a 20 lap qualifying race.

Finishing order
Section reference: 

 Buddy Baker
 Bobby Isaac
 Dick Hutcherson
 Charlie Glotzbach
 G.C. Spencer
 Don White
 Bobby Wawak
 Neil Castles
 Buddy Arrington
 Cale Yarborough*
 J.T. Putney
 Henley Gray
 Bobby Allison*
 Frank Warren
 Donnie Allison*
 John Sears*
 Wayne Smith
 Richard Petty*
 Darel Dieringer*
 Sonny Hutchins*
 Roy Tyner
 A. J. Foyt*
 Clyde Lynn*
 David Pearson*
 Jim Paschal*
 Jack Bowsher*
 Mario Andretti*
 Wendell Scott*
 Bud Moore*
 Elmo Langley*
 Red Farmer*
 Larry Manning*
 Dub Simpson*
 Curtis Turner*
 E.J. Trivette*
 Friday Hassler*
 Larry Hess*
 Paul Goldsmith*
 Bob Cooper*
 Don Schissler*
 Bobby Mausgrover*
 Gordon Johncock*
 James Hylton*
 Whitey Gerken*

* Driver failed to finish race

Failed to qualify
Section reference:

References

National 500
National 500
NASCAR races at Charlotte Motor Speedway